The Brothers 18 is a Wolastoqey (Wəlastəkwey) First Nation reserve in Canada located upon a group of small islands in the mouth of the Kennebecasis River in Saint John County, New Brunswick. The reserve was first returned to the Wolastoqiyik (Wəlastəkwiyik, who are sometimes referred to as the Maliseet or St. John River Indians) on September 19, 1838, and it quickly became a busy settlement where Wolastoqey (Wəlastəkwey) families cleared land, cultivated crops, built homes, and accessed other resources.  The reserve is presently composed of two islands and has an area of about 10 acres.

See also
List of communities in New Brunswick
List of Indian reserves in Canada

References

Indian reserves in New Brunswick
Communities in Saint John County, New Brunswick
1938 establishments in Canada
Populated places established in 1938
Maliseet